Samson Fainsilber (18 June 1904, Iași – 19 December 1983, Paris) was a Romanian-born French film actor. During his career he appeared in around sixty films and television series. He featured in the 1933 historical drama Roger la Honte.

Partial filmography

 The Shark (1930, directed by Henri Chomette) - L'avocat
 La Fin du monde (1931, directed by Abel Gance) - Schomburg
 Les Trois Mousquetaires (1932, directed by Henri Diamant-Berger) - Cardinal Richelieu
 Mater dolorosa (1933)
 Roger la Honte (1933, directed by Gaston Roudès) - Lucien de Noirville
 Jocelyn (1933) - Jocelyn
 The Bread Peddler (1934) - Castel
 Le bossu (1934) - Monsieur de Peyrolles
 Gangster malgré lui (1935) - Marc
 Napoléon Bonaparte (1935) - Danton (voice)
 Escale (1935)
 Odette (1935) - Dario d'Alhucemas
 Jérôme Perreau, héros des barricades (1935, directed by Abel Gance) - Conti
 Marie des angoisses (1935) - Paco
 Retour à l'aube (1938, directed by Henri Decoin) - L'inspecteur Veber
 Tourbillon de Paris (1939, directed by Henri Diamant-Berger)
 Dorothy Looks for Love (1945, directed by Edmond T. Gréville) - Sylvain
 Clandestine (1946) - Dr. Netter
 Le village de la colère (1947)
 Si Versailles m'était conté (1954, directed by Sacha Guitry) - Le cardinal de Mazarin (uncredited)
 Si Paris nous était conté (1956, directed by Sacha Guitry) - Mazarin (uncredited)
 Don Juan, or If Don Juan Were a Woman (1973)
 Stavisky (1974) - L'employé au fichier
 Un linceul n'a pas de poches (1974) - Gonzague
 Il faut vivre dangereusement (1975) - L'homme aux oiseaux
 Providence (1977, directed by Alain Resnais) - The Old Man
 Animal (1977) - Le vieux maquilleur russe
 Charles and Lucie (1979) - Le gobeur d'oeufs
 Subversion (1979)
 La vie est un roman (1983, directed by Alain Resnais) - Zoltán Forbek

References

Bibliography
 Goble, Alan. The Complete Index to Literary Sources in Film. Walter de Gruyter, 1999.

External links

1904 births
1983 deaths
Actors from Iași
Romanian Jews
Romanian emigrants to France
French male film actors
Romanian male film actors